"Passport Home" is a song by English singer JP Cooper. It was released as the third single of his debut studio album Raised Under Grey Skies. The song was released as a digital download in the United Kingdom on 7 April 2017 through Island Records. The song has peaked at number 86 on the UK Singles Chart. The song was written by John Paul Cooper and Jamie Hartman.

Critical reception
Josh Gray from Clash said, "With its stacked gospel backing vocals and optimistic chorus, 'Passport Home' sounds like it was tailor-made for tube station buskers who might be worried that people, especially lawyers, are starting to cotton on to just how many Ed Sheeran covers they crank out every day."

Music video
A video to accompany the release of "Passport Home" was first released onto YouTube on 11 May 2017 at a total length of three minutes and twenty seconds.

Track listing

Charts

Certifications

Release history

References

2017 singles
2017 songs
JP Cooper songs
Island Records singles
Songs written by Jamie Hartman
Songs written by JP Cooper